The 1878 City of Wellington by-election was a by-election held in the multi-member  electorate during the 6th New Zealand Parliament, on 18 February 1878.

The by-election was caused by the resignation of one of the two incumbent MPs, William Travers, and led to his replacement by George Elliott Barton as a form of protest.

Results

References

Wellington 1878
1878 elections in New Zealand
1870s in Wellington
February 1878 events
Politics of the Wellington Region